Insomnia Coffee Company is an Irish independent coffee chain, with headquarters in Dublin. The first store location opened in the back of a Galway bookstore in August 1997. The company has over 150 stores and over 400 self-service units in operation around Ireland. Insomnia stores serve both hot and cold drinks, coffee, sandwiches, salads, soups, snacks, cakes, and pastries.

History
Insomnia has grown from a single location in a Galway bookstore in 1997 to an estate of 150+ coffee shops  with owned stores and franchised stores, through partnerships with SPAR/Eurospar, Mace and Londis as well as other Irish retailers such as Eason & Son, Fresh, Meadows & Byrne, Maxol and Penneys.

In 2003, the company merged with the sandwich company Bendini & Shaw. In 2005, Insomnia acquired the Perk coffee chain.

From 2006-2017, the company was equally owned by chairman Bobby Kerr, CEO Harry O’Kelly, and John Clohisey. In 2010, O'Kelly was appointed CEO and Kerr became chairman. In December 2017, Kerr left the business and sold his shares to the other shareholders. That same month, Clohisey became chairman, CFO Barry Kehoe joined the Board of Directors, and Dara O'Flynn joined as COO.

In April 2012, the Insomnia high street franchise was launched. The first franchise store opened in 2013 in St Stephens Green Shopping Centre, Dublin. In 2015, the company announced a new partnership with Primark, an Irish-based retail chain, which trades in Ireland as Penneys. In 2015, three Insomnia concession stores were rolled out at Penneys in Waterford, Swords and Athlone, with Liffey Valley opening in 2016.

In 2015, Insomnia expanded to the United Kingdom, with a store opening in Market Harborough. It continued to expand in 2016, opening three more UK stores in Calver, Laceby and Bromley, which was the first of seven stores in partnership with Primark. As of September 2022, Insomnia has over 100 stores in the UK, having most recently opened a store in Eastham, Wirral in 2022, in partnership with the Central England Co-operative.

In 2016, a new franchise partnership developed between Insomnia and Maxol, which saw the first store opening in Mulhuddart Service Station in April 2016. In 2018, Insomnia's first coffee drive-thru opened in partnership with Maxol at Maxol Ballycoolin in the heart of the Dublin Enterprise Zone.

Products
Insomnia offers a range of beverages, including tea, coffee and hot chocolate. It also offers food options, including sandwiches, filled baguettes, panini, focaccia, flatbreads, wraps, ciabattas, salads and soups.

See also

 List of coffeehouse chains

References

Further reading
 
 

Retail companies of the Republic of Ireland
Restaurants in Dublin (city)
Retail companies established in 1997
Restaurant chains in Ireland
Restaurants in the Republic of Ireland
Irish brands
Coffeehouses and cafés